Retispora lepidophyta is a spore type and an important biostratigraphic marker of the latest Devonian period. The last appearance of Retispora lepidophyta defines the Devonian-Mississippian boundary in Belgium and other places.

Description
Retispora is trilete, reticulate, and has a distinctly "fried egg" appearance, as the spore is zonate, and the inner area is much darker than the outer area.

References

Incertae sedis
Index fossils
Prehistoric lycophytes
Devonian plants